Kechros is a village and a former community in the Rhodope regional unit, East Macedonia and Thrace, Greece. Since the 2011 local government reform it is part of the municipality Arriana, of which it is a municipal unit. The municipal unit has an area of 140.617 km2. It has a population of 1,222, as of 2011.

References

Populated places in Rhodope (regional unit)